Aryeh Altman (6 January 1902 – 21 August 1982) was an Israeli politician who served as a member of the Knesset for Herut and Gahal between 1951 and 1965.

Biography
Born in Balta in the Russian Empire (today in Ukraine), Altman studied law and economics at Odessa University. In 1921, he joined Tzeiri Zion, and chaired the organisation until 1924. After being imprisoned three times by Soviet authorities, he was sent into exile in 1924. He made aliyah to Mandate Palestine in 1925, and was amongst the founders of the Working Zionists Organization. In 1927, Altman moved to the United States to study sociology and political science at the University of Detroit and then New York University, where he was awarded a PhD in 1935.

Political career
In 1928, he joined the Revisionist Zionism movement, and three years later was elected head of the Revisionist Zionists of America. He returned to Palestine in 1935 following the completion of his PhD, and joined the editorial staff of HaYarden, a Revisionist publication, where he headed the Foreign Affairs department.

In 1937, he became head of the Palestine branch of the Revisionist Zionist Movement, and the following year became a member of the World Presidium of the movement. Between 1939 and 1940 he was a member of the Jewish National Council.

Following Ze'ev Jabotinsky's death in 1940 he became head of the Revisionist Zionist's political department. In 1943 he went to Turkey as an emissary to try to save European Jews from the Holocaust.

In 1945, he became chairman of the Presidium of the Revisionist Zionist Movement. In the 1949 Knesset elections he headed the Brit Hatzohar list, but it failed to cross the electoral threshold. He then joined the rival Revisionist movement, Herut, and was elected to the Knesset on its list in 1951. He was re-elected in 1955, 1959 and 1961, before losing his seat in the 1965 elections.

Between 1955 and 1965 he also served as a member of Jerusalem city council. He died in 1982 at the age of 80.

References

External links
 

1902 births
1982 deaths
People from Balta, Ukraine
People from Baltsky Uyezd
Ukrainian Jews
Soviet emigrants to Mandatory Palestine
Jews in Mandatory Palestine
Israeli people of Ukrainian-Jewish descent
Herut politicians
Gahal politicians
Leaders of political parties in Israel
Members of the 2nd Knesset (1951–1955)
Members of the 3rd Knesset (1955–1959)
Members of the 4th Knesset (1959–1961)
Members of the 5th Knesset (1961–1965)
Odesa University alumni
University of Detroit Mercy alumni
New York University alumni
Burials at the Jewish cemetery on the Mount of Olives
Russian Zionists